True West may refer to:
True West (band), a Paisley Underground band that flourished in the early 1980s
True West (play), a play by Sam Shepard
True West Magazine, a magazine that  began publication in 1953